Wisła Tczew is a Polish professional football and boxing club based in Tczew, Pomerelia, Poland.

Founded in 1924, the club has traditionally worn a white and home kit as well as red and white for away appearances. since inception. The word Wisła is Polish for "Vistula" which indicates  a river in central and Northern Poland, rising in the Carpathian Mountains and flowing generally north and northwest past Warsaw and Toruń, then northeast to enter the Baltic sea via an extensive delta region.

History
The club was established as the Wisła Bowling Club in 1924. The football section was founded in 1927. In 1932, Wisła achieved the best success in the interwar history - 3rd place in Class B (III level), which gave the opportunity to fight in the finals for promotion to Class A (II level). In the 2007/2008 season Wisła advanced from the District Class (Group II) to the 4th league.

From the 2009/2010 season, after the merger with the second Tczew football club - Unia Tczew, Gryf 2009 Tczew was created. In August 2009, senior Wisła juniors already representing Gryf colors, under the care of Mikołaj Bykowski and Krzysztof Śliwa, were successful winning 3rd place in the U-18 category, in the prestigious Remes Cup 2009 tournament by winning the qualifying group with Polonia Warsaw, among others. In June 2009, there was a record transfer in the club's history. Wisla's pupil Paweł Wszołek (born in 1992) was sent to the Polish diaspora in Warsaw.

On May 22, 2015, the reactivation of the Wisła Tczew club was announced. In the 2015–2016 season, Wisła joined the B-class competition. In the 2015/2016 season the club was promoted to Class A. In the 2017/2018 season, Wisła advanced to the Liga V (fifth league).

In addition to the football section, the club also has a boxing section.

Historical names
 1924-1926 ─ Klub Kręglarski Wisła (Wisła Football Club)
 1926-1948 ─ Klub Sportowy Wisła (Wisła Sports Club)
 1948-1954 ─ Koło Sportowe Spójnia-Wisła przy Zrzeszeniu Spójnia PSS „Społem” (Sports Club of Spójnia-Wisła at the Spójnia Association at "Społem")
 1954-1956 ─ Koło Sportowe przy Ludowych Zespołach Sportowych (Sports Circle at the People's Sports Teams)
 1957-1959 ─ Ludowy Klub Sportowy Wisła przy Technicznej Obsłudze Rolnictwa w Tczewie (Wisła People's Sports Club at the Technical Service for Agriculture in Tczew)
 1960-1964 ─ Związkowy Klub Sportowy Wisła przy Zakładach Sprzętu Motoryzacyjnego w Tczewie (Union Wisła Sports Club at the Automotive Equipment Works in Tczew)
 1964-2015 ─ Międzyzakładowy Klub Sportowy Wisła (Inter-factory Wisła Sports Club)
 From 2015 ─ Stowarzyszenie Piłkarskie Wisła (Wisła Football Association)

Successes
 3. place in III Liga - 1932, 1985-1986
 Playoffs for promotion to II Liga - 1932, 1974-1975
 1/32 Polish Cup final - 1987–1988, 1989-1990
 OZPN Polish Cup Gdańsk - 1988-1989

Current squad

Personnel

Current technical staff

Management

Stadium
Wisła play matches at the Stadium Henryka Guze at ul. Ceglarska 5j in Tczew. Technical data of the object:

stadium capacity: 1200 seats (180 seats)
lighting: none
field dimensions: 96 × 67 m
Wisła also performed at the City Stadium at ul. Bałdowska, whose capacity is 2500 seats (including 150 seats), and the dimensions of the pitch is 104 × 64 m.

References

Association football clubs established in 1924
1924 establishments in Poland
Football clubs in Pomeranian Voivodeship